Jonchery-sur-Vesle station (French: Gare de Jonchery-sur-Vesle) is a railway station located in the French municipality of Jonchery-sur-Vesle, in the department of the Marne.

Services 
The station is unstaffed and equipped with ticket dispensing machines. It is served by TER Grand Est trains between Reims and Fismes (line C11), operated by the SNCF.

References 

Railway stations in Marne (department)